Online assistant may refer to:
An automated online assistant
A human virtual assistant